The 2018 Shanghai Masters was a professional snooker tournament that took place in Shanghai, China from 10 to 16 September. It was a 24-man non-ranking invitation event, unlike previous editions of the Shanghai Masters which were ranking events.

Ronnie O'Sullivan successfully defended the title by beating Barry Hawkins 11–9 in the final. 
With this win O'Sullivan became the first player to surpass £10 million in career prize money.

Field
The 24 players were the top-16 in the world rankings after the 2018 World Open, the next four players, outside the top-16 in the world rankings, of Chinese origin, two players from the CBSA under-21 rankings and two from China's Amateur Masters series. The Amateur Masters was won by Pu Qingsong with Guo Hua the runner-up. The two players from the CBSA under-21 rankings were Chang Bingyu and Fan Zhengyi.

Defending champion Ronnie O'Sullivan was the number 1 seed with World Champion Mark Williams seeded 2. The top 8 seeds received byes into the second round.

Prize fund
The breakdown of prize money is shown below:
Winner: £200,000
Runner-up: £100,000
Semi-finals: £60,000
Quarter-finals: £30,000
Last 16: £15,000
Last 24: £7,500
Highest break: £5,000
Total: £725,000

Main draw

Final

Century breaks
Total: 37

 140, 135, 122, 113, 111  Ronnie O'Sullivan
 140, 134  Stuart Bingham
 138, 101, 100  Ding Junhui
 138  Luca Brecel
 136  John Higgins
 135, 131, 114, 100  Kyren Wilson
 134, 132, 125, 114, 103, 101, 100  Barry Hawkins
 134, 110, 100  Anthony McGill
 133  Yan Bingtao
 130, 100  Ryan Day
 128  Judd Trump
 128  Liang Wenbo
 114, 113  Stephen Maguire
 107, 103  Neil Robertson
 103  Mark Williams
 102  Mark Allen

References

2018
2018 in snooker
2018 in Chinese sport
September 2018 sports events in China